The ProFe D-10 Tukan is a Czech high-wing, strut-braced, T-tailed, two-seat motor glider that was designed and produced by ProFe and made available in kit form for amateur construction.

Design and development
The D-10 was designed as a self-launching sailplane. The engine can be retracted in 15 seconds.

The D-10 is predominantly constructed from fibreglass and wood. The cabin is enclosed under a bubble canopy. The conventional landing gear uses two side-by-side, non-retractable mainwheels under the cockpit floor set closely together. The  span wing is supported by a single lift strut and jury struts on each side and employs a Wortmann FX 63-137 airfoil.

Specifications (D-10 Tukan)

See also

References

External links

Photo of a D-10 in flight

1990s Czech and Czechoslovakian sailplanes
Homebuilt aircraft
Motor gliders
High-wing aircraft
Single-engined tractor aircraft
Tukan
T-tail aircraft